Oussouye (or Husuy in Jola) is an urban commune in the Oussouye Department in the Ziguinchor Region of Senegal. It lies in the area of Basse Casamance in the south of the country.

In the census of 2002, Oussouye had 4,052 inhabitants. In 2007, according to official estimates, it had risen to 4,239.

Kasa, a Jola language, is spoken in Oussouye.

The residence of the Prefect at Oussouye is a classified historic site.

References

 This article is partly based on the Oussouye article in the French Wikipedia.

Populated places in Ziguinchor Region
Communes of Senegal
Casamance
Oussouye Department